Nicholas Fadler Martinsen (born 29 May 1994) is a Norwegian competitive sailor, born in Bergen. He qualified to represent Norway at the 2020 Summer Olympics in Tokyo 2021, competing in Nacra 17.

References

External links
 
 

1994 births
Living people
Norwegian male sailors (sport)
Olympic sailors of Norway
Sailors at the 2020 Summer Olympics – Nacra 17
Sportspeople from Bergen